Anapa is a town in Krasnodar Krai, Russia, located on the northern coast of the Black Sea near the Sea of Azov. Population:

History

The area around Anapa was settled in antiquity. It was originally a major seaport (Sinda) and then the capital of Sindica. The colony of Gorgippia was built on the site of Sinda in the 6th century BCE by Pontic Greeks, who named it after a king of the Cimmerian Bosporus. In the 2nd and 3rd centuries BCE, Gorgippia flourished as part of the Bosporan Kingdom, as did its guild of shipowners, which controlled maritime trade in the eastern part of the Black Sea. A fine statue of Neokles (a local potentate, son of Herodoros) was unearthed by Russian archaeologists and is now on exhibit at the Russian Museum. Gorgippia was inhabited until the 3rd century CE, when it was overrun by neighbouring native tribes. These tribes, of Circassian or Adyghe origin (specifically of the Natkhuay tribe), gave Anapa its modern name.

Later the Black Sea littoral was overrun by successive waves of Asiatic nomads, including the Sarmatians, Ostrogoths, Huns, Avars, Gokturks, Khazars, Tatars and Circassians who are native to the Northwestern Caucasus. The settlement was renamed Mapa by the Genoese at the turn of the 14th century. Genoese domination lasted until the arrival of an Ottoman fleet in 1475. The Turks later built a fort against the Russian Cossacks. The fortress was repeatedly attacked by the Russian Empire and was all but destroyed during its last siege in 1829. The town was passed to Russia after the Treaty of Adrianople (1829). See . It was included in Black Sea Okrug of Kuban Oblast and was granted town status in 1846.

It was occupied by Ottomans between 1853 and 1856 during the Crimean War. It became part of Black Sea Governorate in 1896. Elizabeth Pilenko, later named as a saint in the Eastern Orthodox Church, was the mayor during the Russian Revolution. It became part of Kuban-Black Sea Oblast in 1920. During World War II, it was occupied and totally demolished by Nazi Germany with the help of Romanian troops between August 30, 1942 and September 22, 1943.

Administrative and municipal status
Within the framework of administrative divisions, Anapa serves as the administrative center of Anapsky District, even though it is not a part of it. As an administrative division, it is, together with three rural localities, incorporated separately as the Town of Anapa—an administrative unit with the status equal to that of the districts. As a municipal division, the territories of the Town of Anapa and of Anapsky District are incorporated as Anapa Urban Okrug.

Tourism
The town boasts a number of sanatoria and hotels. Anapa, Sochi, and several other cities along the Russian coast of the Black Sea have enjoyed a substantial increase in popularity among Russians since the dissolution of the Soviet Union, which left traditional Soviet resort cities in Georgia and Ukraine. Anapa is served by the Anapa Airport.

Anapa, like the other Black Sea coast resorts, has a superb sunny summer climate. Anapa has beautiful, mostly sandy beaches. However, Anapa seldom attracts tourists from outside Russia due to its modest infrastructure and its inconvenient accessibility from Europe via Moscow or Krasnodar. Anapa remains an attractive option for Russians who prefer the inexpensive Russian resort to other destinations.

Transportation

Transportation facilities include the Anapa Airport, a railway station, an international passenger port for small-tonnage ships, a bus station, and a network of highways.

Climate
Anapa has a humid subtropical climate (Köppen climate classification Cfa) with mediterranean (Csa) influences at the lower elevations. Compared to cities further south along the coast like Novorossiysk and Sochi, Anapa receives considerably less rainfall but has somewhat colder winters.

Culture
The Town Theater of Anapa is located on Krymskaya Street. It was opened after the reconstruction of the Town Cultural Center. There are twenty nine public libraries including four for children. In 2010 the libraries of Anapa received more than 8,000 books, and magazines and newspapers were ordered costing more than 1,000,000 roubles, in addition, nine hundred CDs were purchased. 

There is museum of Local History on Protapova Street.

Architecture and sights
The Gorgippia Archeological museum
Gates of Turkish fortress
Church of St. Onuphrius
Lighthouse
Wildlife preserve of Bolshoy Utrish south of Sukko

List of mayors
Maria Skobtsova
Valentin Mashukov
Germogen Korolyov
Mikhail Boyur
Vitaly Astapenko
Vladimir Tsukanov
Anatoly Pakhomov
Tatyana Yevsikova

Activities carried out in the town
Kinoshock Film Festival
Blue-eyed Anapa song Festival
Russian coast guard academy

Twin towns and sister cities

Anapa is twinned with:
 Gomel, Belarus
 Novy Urengoy, Russia
 Larissa, Greece

Gallery

References

Notes

Sources

External links
Official website of Anapa Urban Okrug 
Anapa Information Portal 
Directory of organizations in Anapa 

Cities and towns in Krasnodar Krai
Anapa Urban Okrug
Populated places established in the 6th century BC
Milesian Pontic colonies
Bosporan Kingdom
Seaside resorts in Russia
Territories of the Republic of Genoa
1846 establishments in the Russian Empire